The Lincoln C is a concept car manufactured by Lincoln, which was unveiled at the 2009 North American International Auto Show.

The Ford Sync system features a female avatar called Eva, which can be customized.

A production version of the Lincoln C concept has not been officially announced or unveiled, but the concept remained on the official Lincoln website as a "future vehicle." With Ford having canceled the Mercury brand and investing heavily in Lincoln, Ford canceled the C concept and its successor was the Lincoln MKC concept unveiled in 2013.

References

External links
Lincoln C Concept: Big Luxury in Small Package

Front-wheel-drive vehicles
Cars introduced in 2009
Compact cars
Hatchbacks
C